

List

By-elections

1996
12 December: Merseyside, West--Richard Corbett (Lab), replacing deceased Kenneth Stewart

1998
7 May: Yorkshire, South--Linda McAvan (Lab), replacing resigned Norman West
26 November: Scotland, North East--Ian Hudghton (SNP), replacing deceased Allan Macartney

Changes of allegiance

 Ken Coates and Hugh Kerr had the Labour whip suspended in January 1998 when they joined the Green group in the European Parliament; Kerr subsequently joined the Scottish Socialist Party.
 James Moorhouse changed from Conservative to Liberal Democrat on 8 October 1998.
 Brendan Donnelly and John Stevens resigned from the Conservative Party in January 1999 and subsequently established the Pro-Euro Conservative Party.
 Tom Spencer had the Conservative whip suspended on 31 January 1999.

See also
1994 European Parliament election in the United Kingdom

References 

1994
List
United Kingdom